Boudin are various kinds of sausage in French, Luxembourgish, Belgian, Swiss, Québécois, Acadian, Aostan, Louisiana Creole, and Cajun cuisine.

Etymology

The Anglo-Norman word  meant 'sausage', 'blood sausage' or 'entrails' in general. Its origin is unclear. It has been traced both to Romance and to Germanic roots, but there is not good evidence for either (cf. boudin.

Types
Instead of the filling being stuffed into pork casings, it is rolled into a ball, battered, and deep-fried.
 : Originally, a white sausage made of pork without the blood. Variants include:
 French/Belgian boudin blanc, with milk. Generally sautéed or grilled.
 Cajun boudin blanc, made from a pork and rice mixture (much like dirty rice) in pork casings. Often includes pork liver and heart.  Generally simmered or braised, although it may also be grilled.
 : a traditional French , which may only contain pork meat, fresh whole eggs and milk, and cannot contain any breadcrumbs or flours/starches. It is protected under EU law with a Protected geographical indication status.
 : A dark-hued blood sausage, containing pork, pig blood, and other ingredients. Variants of the  occur in French, Belgian, Cajun and Catalan cuisine.
This originated from the French .
 : A green sausage made of pork meat and cabbage and kale. Popular in the Belgian province of Walloon Brabant.
 : with beetroot, spices, wine and beef or pork blood, in the Aosta Valley of Italy.
 Brown-rice : Brown-rice  is a less common variation made from brown rice with taste similar to traditional pork .
 Crawfish : Popular in Cajun cuisine, crawfish  is made with the meat of crawfish tails added to rice.  It is often served with cracklins (fried pig skins) and saltine crackers, hot sauce, and ice-cold beer.
 Gator : Made from alligator, gator  can be found sporadically in Louisiana and the Mississippi gulf coast.
 Shrimp : Similar to crawfish , shrimp  is made by adding the shrimp to rice.

In the United States
The term boudin in the Acadiana region of Louisiana is commonly understood to refer only to boudin blanc and not to other variants. Boudin blanc is the staple boudin of this region and is the one most widely consumed, and is just referred to as boudin. Also popular is seafood boudin consisting of crawfish or crab, shrimp, and rice. Most of Louisiana's Cajuns do not consider boudin a sausage.

Cajun boudin is available most readily in southern Louisiana, particularly in the Scott (considered to be the Boudin Capital of the World), New Iberia, and Lafayette areas, though it may be found nearly anywhere in "Cajun Country". Boudin can even be found in areas outside of this, including eastern Texas. There are numerous meat markets and Cajun stores devoted to the speciality, though boudin is also sold from many convenience and grocery stores in other towns and areas along Interstate 10 (i.e., Lake Charles area). Since boudin freezes well, it can be shipped anywhere outside the region. Boudin is one of the stars of Cajun cuisine (e.g., jambalaya, gumbo, étouffée, and dirty rice) and has fanatic devotees that travel across Louisiana comparing the numerous handmade varieties. From the Lake Charles to New Orleans areas, boudin's taste and flavors can vary. Some such as Foreman's Boudin Kitchen use no liver, and other such as Richard's Cajun Kitchen use liver.

Boudin Noir is available in Illinois in the Iroquois County towns of Papineau and Beaverville. The dish is the featured cuisine at the annual Beaverville Founder's Day, held the second weekend of September. People travel from hundreds of miles to partake of the boudin.

"Le Boudin"
Boudin gave rise to "Le Boudin", the official march of the French Foreign Legion. "Blood sausage" is a colloquial reference to the gear (rolled up in a red blanket) that used to top the backpacks of Legionnaires. The song makes repeated reference to the fact that the Belgians do not get any "blood sausage", since the king of the Belgians at one time forbade his subjects from joining the Legion (the verse says "ce sont des tireurs au cul).

See also

 Black pudding
 Blood sausage
 White pudding

References

External links 
 

American sausages
French sausages
Blood sausages
Cajun cuisine
Savory puddings
Meat and grain sausages

wa:Tripe (amagnî)